Záboří is a municipality and village in Strakonice District in the South Bohemian Region of the Czech Republic. It has about 300 inhabitants.

Notable people
Adolph J. Sabath (1866–1952), American politician

References

Villages in Strakonice District